Donald E. Pelotte SSS (April 13, 1945 – January 7, 2010) was an American prelate of Abenaki descent in the Roman Catholic Church.  He served as the third bishop of the Diocese of Gallup in New Mexico from 1986 to 2008. Pelotte was the first Native American to be appointed a Catholic bishop in the United States.

Biography

Early life 
Donald Pelotte was born on April 13, 1945, in Waterville, Maine, to Norris Albert Pelotte and Margaret Yvonne LaBrie Pelotte. His father was Abenaki, and his mother was of French-Canadian descent. Donald and his twin brother Dana were the youngest of five brothers. 

Donald Pelotte studied at Eymard Seminary in Hyde Park, New York during his high school years. He did his college studies John Carroll University in Cleveland, Ohio and later completed doctoral studies at Fordham University in New York City. His doctoral dissertation was entitled: John Courtney Murray, Theologian in Conflict: Roman Catholicism and the American Experience. This was later published in book form by Paulist Press.

Priesthood 
Pelotte was ordained a priest on September 2, 1972, by Bishop Edward Cornelius O’Leary.At age 33, he became the Provincial Superior of the Congregation of the Blessed Sacrament and was the youngest major superior of a religious community of men in the United States at the time.

Coadjutor Bishop and Bishop of Gallup 
On February 24, 1986, Pope John Paul II named Pelotte as coadjutor bishop of the Diocese of Gallup; he was consecrated on May 6, 1986 by Archbishop Robert Fortune Sanchez. Upon the retirement of Jerome J. Hastrich, then Bishop of Gallup, on March 31, 1990, Pelotte automatically replaced him. 

From 1986 to 2008, Pelotte also served as the episcopal moderator of the Tekakwitha Conference, an association of Native American and First Nation Catholics.  In 1992, Pelotte walked out of the Tekawitha annual meeting.  This was in response to a dissident group within the conference that accused the Catholic Church of ignoring Native American rituals.

Pelotte is also the only known Roman Catholic bishop to have ordained his own twin brother. Pelotte ordained Father Dana F. Pelotte to the priesthood, on September 4, 1999, in Waterville.

On July 23, 2007, Pelotte suffered a traumatic brain injury at his Gallup home. According to chancery officials and a police report, Pelotte said that he fell down his stairs.  He was hospitalized at John C. Lincoln Hospital in Phoenix, Arizona, spending some time in the intensive care unit.

On January 3, 2008, Pope Benedict XVI appointed Thomas J. Olmsted, the bishop of Phoenix, as apostolic administrator sede plena of the Diocese of Gallup, and granted Pelotte a one-year leave of absence to continue his recovery.  One year later, after seeing pictures of himself from the Emergency Department, Pelotte said he was no longer sure that his injuries were the result of a fall.  This statement fueled speculation that his injuries came from being assaulted.

Retirement and legacy 
On April 30, 2008, Pope Benedict XVI accepted Pelotte's resignation as bishop of the Diocese of Gallup. 

O December 30, 2009, Pelotte was hospitalized in Gallup in critical condition. He died on January 7, 2010. The funeral mass for Pelotte was held on January 14, 2010, at the Sacred Heart Cathedral in Gallup. Per his wishes, he was buried in the crypt of the cathedral.

Notes

American people of Abenaki descent
People from Waterville, Maine
20th-century Roman Catholic bishops in the United States
21st-century Roman Catholic bishops in the United States
1945 births
2010 deaths
Religious figures of the indigenous peoples of North America
John Carroll University alumni
Fordham University alumni
Writers from Maine
Writers from New Mexico
American twins
People from Hyde Park, New York
Roman Catholic Diocese of Gallup
Catholics from New York (state)
Catholics from Maine